The municipality of Ramón Trigo is one of the municipalities of Cerro Largo Department, Uruguay, established on 3 April 2013. Its seat is the town of Ramón Trigo.

History 
By Decree No. 11/2013 of 3 April 2013, the Departmental Board of Cerro Largo, after the initiative of the Intendant of the Department, allowed the creation of a new municipality based on Ramón Trigo settlement, authorized by Law No. 18567 that allowed the creation of municipalities around settlements with less than 2000 inhabitants, provided this was passed by the Departmental Board after the initiative of the Intendant of the Department. At that time the territorial jurisdiction reached the urban and suburban area of the cadastral town.

By Law No. 19313 of 27 March 2015, in compliance with the ruling of Law No. 19272, was ratified its creation and assigned the electoral constituency series GFD of Cerro Largo Department as defined by the Electoral Board of Cerro Largo.

In 30 October 2018, the territorial reach of the municipality was expanded to match the whole territory of the electoral constituency GFD, ordered by the Departmental Board Decree No. 28/2018.

Location 
It borders to the northeast with Isidoro Noblía municipality, to the east with Bañado de Medina municipality, to the southeast with Fraile Muerto municipality, to the southwest with Tres Islas municipality and to the northwest with Rivera and Tacuarembó Departments. Its seat is the town of Ramón Trigo.

Authorities 
The authority of the municipality is the Municipal Council, integrated by the Mayor (who presides it) and four Councilors.

References 

Ramón Trigo
States and territories established in 2013
2013 establishments in Uruguay